The men's 4 kilometres team pursuit competition at the 2014 Asian Games was held on 20 and 21 September at the Incheon International Velodrome.

Schedule
All times are Korea Standard Time (UTC+09:00)

Records

Results

Qualifying

First round

Heat 1

Heat 2

Heat 3

Heat 4

Summary

Finals

7–8

5–6

Bronze

Gold

References 
Results

External links 
 

Track Men team pursuit